The Palm Beach Road is a  six-lane access controlled road and an upmarket and affluent residential and commercial road that connects Vashi and Belapur through Sanpada, Nerul, running parallel to the Mumbai Harbour.

Safety 
The road has witnessed accidents in the past, earning it the name "Killer Road". Speed Limit and safety signs have been put up along the road. Fences have been installed on both the sides of the road and the divider to prevent pedestrians from crossing. Three sets of rumblers were added to reduce the speed of the vehicles on the road, but later removed.

References 

Transport in Navi Mumbai